In enzymology, a tau-protein kinase is an enzyme that catalyzes the chemical reaction

ATP + tau protein  ADP + O-phospho-tau-protein

Thus, the two substrates of this enzyme are ATP and tau protein, whereas its two products are ADP and O-phospho-tau-protein.

This enzyme belongs to the family of transferases, specifically, those transferring a phosphate group to the sidechain oxygen atom of serine or threonine residues in proteins (protein-serine/threonine kinases). This enzyme participates in 14 metabolic pathways: erbb signaling pathway, cell cycle, wnt signaling pathway, hedgehog signaling pathway, axon guidance, focal adhesion, b cell receptor signaling pathway, insulin signaling pathway, melanogenesis, alzheimer's disease, colorectal cancer, endometrial cancer, prostate cancer, and basal cell carcinoma.

Nomenclature 

The systematic name of this enzyme class is ATP:[tau-protein] O-phosphotransferase. Other names in common use include ATP:tau-protein O-hosphotransferase, brain protein kinase PK40erk, cdk5/p20, CDK5/p23, glycogen synthase kinase-3beta, GSK, protein tau kinase, STK31, tau kinase, [tau-protein] kinase, tau-protein kinase I, tau-protein kinase II, tau-tubulin kinase, TPK, TPK I, TPK II, and TTK.

Structural studies

Examples 

Human genes encoding proteins with Tau-protein kinase activity include:

 BRSK1
 BRSK2
 GSK3A
 GSK3B

References

 
 
 
 

EC 2.7.11
Enzymes of known structure